Sri Kaagapujandar (Tamil:காகபுஜண்டர்) is considered to be an eminent siddha in Siddhar tradition, a  saint who has reached particularly exalted a high degree of physical and spiritual perfection.  According to legend he lived around the 7th century CE. Jeeva samadhi of Sri Kaagapujandar is present in the Sornapureeshwar Temple in Thenponparapi village situated near Chinna salem, Villupuram District. His birth star is Ayilyam. Sri Kaagapujandar was mentioned by Karuvoorar and author K.S.Pillai as one of the 18 siddhars (பதினென் சித்தர்கள்).

He also called as Kaagapusundi, Kaagapusundar, and Pujankar.

A song from His book Gnanam 80

- People search God in this world, i.e. outside, ignoring that God resides within us.

Legends about Kaagapujandar

Sri Kaagapujandar, according to legend, has seen many destructions of the universe(pralaya) and recreation of new one as a crow, hence the name Kaga. Kagam in Tamil means crow. Sri Kaagapujandar is the master in the art of Immortality. He is the one who gives diksha (initiation) to Shiva in every era. Sri Kaagapujandar gave upadhesa (instruction) to Sri Vashistar, guru of Sri Rama.

Siddhar Sri Roma rishi is said to be son of Sri Kaagapujandar.

Once the gods Brahma, Vishnu and Shiva ended up in a heated argument to know who is the eldest, finally Narada told them that there is only one Maharishi who can tell who is the eldest. Trimurti wondered how old that Maharishi would have to be, in order to  know who is the eldest. They came to know that Sri Kaagapujandar who seen many apocalypse, beginning of new era and new Trimurthi for every era. Trimurthi praised Sri Kaagapujandar as a remarkable one and great siddha.

Books
Sri Kaagapujandar wrote many books in Tamil, written in palm leaves; most have been lost. Those remainings found are transferred into paper with the help of siddhas and palm readers. The book Perunool kaviyam 1000 (Tamil:பெருநூல் காவியம் 1000) has an account of most of the siddhas. Below listed the songs where the particular siddhas are mentioned.

Agasthiyar - Song 141
Bogar, Karuvoorar, Dhanvantari - Song 143
Pulathiyar, Sattaimuni, Macchamuni, Korakkar, Rama Thevar - Song 155
Thirumoolar - Song 279
Vashistar, Kirshnakonaar, Viyasar - Song 440
Vishwamithrar, Konkanar - Song 782
Thiruvalluvar, Kasinathar, Thatheesinathar, Koormamuni, Athiri - Song 783
Idaikadar, Kalai kotaan - Song 784

Temples

Swarnapureeshwarar Temple, Chinna Salem, Tamil Nadu
Sri Swarna Kala Bhairavar Temple, Aati Sakthi Peetam (Previously known as Kaga Ashram), Thiruvannamalai, Tamil Nadu
Siddharghal Temple, Madambakkam, Chennai, Tamil Nadu
 Sri Shakti Arutkoodam, Tambaram, Chennai, Tamil Nadu

See also

 Rishi
 Bhusunda

References

Shaivism
Hindu philosophers and theologians